WORT (89.9 FM) is a listener-sponsored community radio station, broadcasting from 118 S. Bedford St. in Madison, Wisconsin, United States.  WORT offers a range of programming.

WORT's FM signal reaches a roughly 50-mile radius around Madison.  In early 2006, the station began webcasting all of its programming in both high-quality (96k) and low-quality (32k) streams.  WORT also maintains an archive of recent news and public affairs programs available for podcast, download, or stream.

Programming

WORT broadcasts a mix of music news and talk programming.  All of WORT's music programs are produced by local DJs.  WORT airs 30 hours of news and public affairs programming per week, 21.5 hours of which are reported and hosted by volunteers. All of the programmers at the station are volunteers from the community, including DJs, hosts, reporters, and engineers.

Music programming
The weekday music schedule includes:

Classical
Folk
Bluegrass
Old School Country
World 
Jazz
Rock
Techno
Metal
Blues

The weekend music lineup includes a range of genres.  Saturday's programming is divided into two-hour shows, including:
Traditional Mexican music
Classic R&B
Vintage jazz and swing
Reggae
Pan-African
Salsa
Latin jazz
Rock 'n' roll oldies
Blues
Hip-hop.

Sunday's music includes:
Medieval and Renaissance music
Women's music
Show tunes
World music
Kids' music
Gospel
Electronic
Experimental
Avant-garde music.

News and public affairs programming
 Insurgent Radio Kiosk: commentaries, "this day in history" notes, and community event info 
 Eight O'Clock Buzz:  mix of music, culture, information, news and interviews
 A Public Affair: call-in show on issues of international, national and local importance
 Democracy Now
 Mel & Floyd
 BBC Headline News (taken from the BBC World Service)
 Letters & Politics with Mitch Jeserich (syndicated from KPFA)
 WORT Local News: Alternative local and state news
 En Nuestro Patio: Local, national, and international news and interviews in Spanish.
 Labor Radio: News for, by, and about working people
 Access Hour: A different host from the community every week.
 Radio Literature: Poetry, fiction, non-fiction readings and discussion
 Queery: local and national news affecting Madison's LGBTQ+ community
 Perpetual Notion Machine: Science news and features
 Hmong Radio: News, announcements, interviews, and music in Hmong language
 Her Turn: News by and about women, though all are encouraged to listen
 World View: News of the world from a left-critical perspective
 Salamat: A weekly window into the vastly varied population of Arab-Americans
 Universal Soul Explosion/After Hours: Hip-hop, R&B, old and new with music and commentary
 Madison Book Beat: Author interviews with a local connection

Organizational structure
The organizational structure of WORT reflects the station's principles of democratic decision making; the staff and volunteers at the station elect the Board of Directors; the Board sets policy and hires full-time and part-time paid staff. The full-time staff is organized as a collective that oversees the day-to-day operations of the station.

Volunteers provide most of the on-air programming. In addition, many volunteers contribute to off-air operations.

History
WORT went on the air on December 1 1975, broadcasting at 89.7 FM from Winnebago Avenue. The station later moved to Bedford Street, and the frequency was later changed to 89.9 FM.

The station sends many hosts and producers on to other professional outlets, including Wisconsin Public Radio. Radio host Michael Feldman became a volunteer in 1977, broadcasting "The Breakfast Special" from a diner on Madison's east side every morning for several years before joining Wisconsin Public Radio. WPR hosts Rob Ferrett and Jonathan Overby, as well as executive producers Judith-Siers Poisson and Molly Stentz, are alums of WORT.

2018 studio shooting
Early in the morning of August 5, 2018, a masked suspect entered the station's studios and began shooting. Five shots were fired at three hosts, with on-air personality Eugene Crisler’EL taking a shot in his right buttock; he was treated and released from the hospital quickly after the incident, and some minor studio damage occurred. The station remained in dead air for 6½ hours until Madison Police finished their evidence gathering procedures and allowed broadcasting to resume, and have said the incident was not random, but targeted at the station.

Affiliations
WORT is a member of the National Federation of Community Broadcasters and the Grassroots Radio Coalition.  The station hosted the GRC-5 Conference in 2000 and GRC-11 in 2006.

WORT is an affiliate of the Pacifica network, the World Association of Community Radio Broadcasters (AMARC), and the Public Radio Satellite System, which is how it broadcasts programs like the BBC, supplied in the U.S. by American Public Media.  The station is also a member of the Wisconsin Broadcasters Association.

Awards
WORT has been voted "Madison's Favorite Radio Station" in the Isthmus Annual Manual (readers' poll) sixteen times. Several of its programs have made the top three list of favorite radio shows, including Mel & Floyd (multiple years), Back to the Country, and Pan-Africa.

WORT's news department frequently wins awards from the Wisconsin Broadcasters Association as well as the Milwaukee Press Club.

WORT received two Wisconsin Broadcasters Association Merit Awards for its 2006 documentary on Uganda's "invisible children" and its 2005 documentary on the Hurricane Katrina aftermath.  It won best documentary in 2005 from Public Radio News Directors Incorporated for its investigation of pollution at the Madison Kipp factory.  It also received a WBA Merit Award for its 2005 election lead-up coverage. In 2016, it received three Milwaukee Press Club awards, including a first-place award for coverage of the 2015 shooting of Tony Robinson. In 2020, it received two Milwaukee Press Club awards for best news coverage, for stories on protests after the firing of a local school security guard and a local community grocery store.

In 2021, the station received five Wisconsin Broadcaster's Association awards, including a first-place award for a report on the removal of a neighborhood's postal services. It also won five awards from the Milwaukee Press Club, including a gold award for a report on the Dow Chemical Company protests in 1967, and a gold award for reporting on disparate medical treatment and outcomes for Black women in Dane County.

See also
List of community radio stations in the United States

References

External links
 Official website
 
 The Daily Cardinal. "Community radio station celebrates 30 years of diversity"

ORT
Community radio stations in the United States
Culture of Madison, Wisconsin
Radio stations established in 1975
1975 establishments in Wisconsin
Mass media in Madison, Wisconsin